Spermacoce brachysepala, the West Indian false buttonweed, is a plant species in the Rubiaceae. It is native to Puerto Rico, Haiti and the Dominican Republic.

References

External links
US Department of Agriculture Plants Profile
Gardening Europe 

brachysepala
Flora of the Dominican Republic
Flora of Haiti
Flora of Puerto Rico
Plants described in 1912
Flora without expected TNC conservation status